Sameer Hinduja is an American social scientist. He serves as Professor of Criminology at Florida Atlantic University and Co-Director of the Cyberbullying Research Center. He has served as a Fulbright Specialist Scholar at Dublin City University and currently serves as Faculty Associate at the Berkman Klein Center at Harvard University. Hinduja is also the Co-Founder and Co-Editor-in-Chief of the International Journal of Bullying Prevention. He is an international expert in cyberbullying, sexting, sextortion, online and offline dating violence, digital self-harm, and related forms of online harm among youth. He has written seven books, including Bullying Today: Bullet Points and Best Practices, Bullying Beyond the Schoolyard: Preventing and Responding to Cyberbullying, and School Climate 2.0. His research publications have been cited approximately 20,000 times, and have appeared in such outlets as Journal of Adolescent Health, Journal of Youth and Adolescence, Journal of Interpersonal Violence, Computers in Human Behavior, and New Media and Society. Topics studied include empathy, psychological resilience, parenting, social and emotional learning, school climate, and well-being.

Education 
Hinduja grew up in Florida and received his bachelor's degree in Criminal Justice (minoring in Legal Studies) from the University of Central Florida. Then he attended Michigan State University where he received his master's degree in Criminal Justice before earning his Ph.D. in criminal justice (cognate: Computer Science).

Professional Life 
Hinduja has given talks nationally and internationally on a number of topics that deal with the prevention of, and response to, youth technology abuse and misuse. Specific events include keynotes or keynote panels for the RSA, the World Anti-Bullying Forum, the International Bullying Prevention Association, Australia’s eSafety Conference, and the Association for Middle Level Education. Hinduja has also testified in 2018 on cyberbullying and school safety in front of the United States Attorney General and the Department of Education, Health and Human Services, and Homeland Security and has presented on School Safety and Violence Prevention at a 2015 Congressional Briefing. His work involves original data collection from tweens and teens primarily in the United States but also across the world, and is also informed by partnerships with non-profits, media companies, and social media platforms. With his research partner Dr. Justin W. Patchin, he co-directs the Cyberbullying Research Center. The mission of the Center is to contribute evidence-based insight into the challenges children confront online every day. The Center's work has empowered youth and adults around the world to get the most out of their online experiences by minimizing potential harms and maximizing benefits.

Publications

Academic papers 
 Hinduja, S. & Patchin, J. W. (2022). Bullying and Cyberbullying Offending: The Influence of Six Parenting Dimensions Among US Youth. Journal of Child and Family Studies, 31, 1454-1473. 
 Meldrum, R. C., Young, J. Patchin, J. W., & Hinduja, S. (2021). Bullying Victimization, Negative Emotions, and Digital Self-Harm: Testing a Theoretical Model of Indirect Effects. Deviant Behavior, 43 (3), 303-321. 
 Patchin, J. W. & Hinduja, S. (2021). Cyberbullying Among Tweens in the United States: Prevalence, Impact, and Helping Behaviors. Journal of Early Adolescence, 42 (3), 414-430. 
 Lee, C., Patchin, J. W., Hinduja, S., Dischinger, A. (2020). Bullying and Delinquency: The Impact of Anger and Frustration. Violence and Victims, 35 (4), 503-523. 
 Hinduja, S. & Patchin, J. W. (2020). Digital Dating Abuse Among a National Sample of U.S. Youth. Journal of Interpersonal Violence, 36 (23-24), 11088-11108.
 Patchin, J. W. & Hinduja, S. (2020). It’s Time to Teach Safe Sexting. Journal of Adolescent Health, 66 (2), 140-143. 
 Patchin, J. W. & Hinduja, S. (2019). The Nature and Extent of Sexting Among Middle and High School Students. Archives of Sexual Behavior, 48, 2333-2343.
 Hinduja, S. & Patchin, J. W. (2019). Connecting Adolescent Suicide to the Severity of Bullying and Cyberbullying. Journal of School Violence, 18:3, 333-346.  
 Hinduja, S.  & Patchin, J. W. (2018). Deterring Teen Bullying: Assessing the Impact of Perceived Punishment From Police, Schools, and Parents. Youth Violence and Juvenile Justice, 16 (2), 190-207.  
 Patchin, J. W. & Hinduja, S. (2018). Sextortion Among Adolescents: Results from a National Survey of U.S. Youth. Sexual Abuse: A Journal of Research and Treatment, 32 (1), 30-54.
 Patchin, J. W. & Hinduja, S. (2017). Digital Self-Harm. Journal of Adolescent Health, 61, 761-766. 
 Hinduja, S. & Patchin, J. W. (2017). Cultivating Youth Resilience to Prevent Bullying and Cyberbullying Victimization. Child Abuse & Neglect, 73, 51-62. 
 Patchin, J. W. & Hinduja, S. (2013). Cyberbullying among Adolescents: Implications for Empirical Research. Journal of Adolescent Health, 53(4), 431-432. 
 Sabella, R. A., Patchin, J. W., & Hinduja, S. (2013). Cyberbullying myths and realities. Computers in Human Behavior, 29(6), 2703-2711. 
 Hinduja, S. & Kooi, B. (2013). Curtailing Cyber and Information Security Vulnerabilities through Situational Crime Prevention. Security Journal, 26(4):383-402. 
 Hinduja, S.  & Patchin, J. W.  (2013).  Social Influences on Cyberbullying Behaviors Among Middle and High School Students. Journal of Youth and Adolescence, 42 (5), 711-722.

Books 
Patchin, J.W. & Hinduja, S. (2016). Bullying Today: Bullet Points and Best Practices. Thousand Oaks, CA: Sage Publications.  

Hinduja, S. & Patchin, J. W. (2015). Bullying Beyond the Schoolyard: Preventing and Responding to Cyberbullying. Thousand Oaks, CA: Sage Publications (Corwin Press). 2nd Edition.  

Patchin, J. W. & Hinduja, S. (2014). Words Wound: Delete Cyberbullying and Make Kindness Go Viral. Minneapolis, MN: Free Spirit Publishing.  <

Patchin, J. W. & Hinduja, S. (2014). A Leader’s Guide to Words Wound. Minneapolis, MN: Free Spirit Publishing.

Hinduja, S. & Patchin, J. W. (2012). School Climate 2.0: Preventing Cyberbullying and Sexting One Classroom at a Time. Thousand Oaks, CA: Sage Publications (Corwin Press).  

Patchin, J. W. & Hinduja, S. (2012). Cyberbullying Prevention and Response: Expert Perspectives. New York: Routledge. ,

Hinduja, S. & Patchin, J. W. (2009). Bullying Beyond the Schoolyard: Preventing and Responding to Cyberbullying. Thousand Oaks, CA: Sage Publications (Corwin Press). 

Hinduja, S. (2006). Music Piracy and Crime Theory. New York: LFB Scholarly, Inc.

TEDx Talks 
 Single-Minded Focus, TEDx, Florida Atlantic University
 The Lost Art of Listening, TEDx, Florida Atlantic University
 Comparing Ourselves to Others, TEDx, Florida Atlantic University

Awards and honors 
 Fulbright Specialist Award Recipient, 2017
 Auburn University's Global Anti-Bullying Hero Award, 2015
 Florida Atlantic University's Researcher of the Year Award, 2015, 2010
 Children's Wireless Safety Achievement Award from the Wireless Foundation, 2014
 Michigan State University's Distinguished Young Alumni Award, 2014
 Michigan State University's School of Criminal Justice Wall of Fame inductee, 2012

References 

American social scientists
Cyberbullying
Digital media use and mental health
Michigan State University alumni
University of Central Florida alumni
Florida Atlantic University faculty
Living people
Year of birth missing (living people)